Günther Rötter (born 1954) is a German musicologist and music psychologist.

Life and career 
There, he received his doctorate in 1985 under the direction of Helga de la Motte-Haber on the subject: 'Die Beeinflussbarkeit emotionalen Erlebens von Musik durch analytisches Hören. From 1989 to 1994, he was a research assistant at the University of Münster. After a professorship at the University of Vechta and the habilitation in 1996, Günther Rötter received a professorship for musicology at the Technische Universität Dortmund. From 2006 to 2014, he was dean of the Faculty of Arts and Sports Sciences there.

Rötter's research focus is on the psychology of music. In empirical studies he often deals with topics close to everyday life, such as music at the dentist or listening to music in the car. In doing so, he refuted unchecked assumptions such as that listening to music during homework distracted pupils
or that music in the department shop increases the willingness to buy.

Rötter is (co-)publisher of encyclopaedias and manuals in the field of systematic musicology.

Publications 
 Handbuch Funktionale Musik. Psychologie – Technik – Anwendungsgebiete. Springer, Berlin, New York,  (print)  (Online-Version Inhalte)
 with Helga de la Motte-Haber (ed.): Lexikon der Systematischen Musikwissenschaft. – Musikästhetik – Musiktheorie – Musikpsychologie – Musiksoziologie vol. 6. , Laaber 2010 
 with Helga la Motte-Haber (ed.) Musikpsychologie. Handbuch der systematischen Musikwissenschaft vol. 3. Laaber: Laaber-Verlag. 2004 
 mit Martin Ebeling (ed.): Hören und Fühlen. Schriftenreihe der Carl Stumpf Gesellschaft, Lang, Frankfurt 2012, 
 Musik und Zeit. Kognitive Reflexion versus rhythmische Interpretation. Lang, Frankfurt 1997, 
 Die Beeinflussbarkeit emotionalen Erlebens von Musik durch analytisches Hören. Dissertation. Lang, Frankfurt 1996,

References

External links 

German musicologists
Academic staff of the Technical University of Dortmund
1954 births
Living people
People from Lower Saxony